Asila Mirzayorova (born 3 July 1999) is a visually impaired Uzbekistani Paralympic athlete. She won the silver medal in the women's long jump T11 event at the 2020 Summer Paralympics held in Tokyo, Japan. She also set a new personal best of 4.91 metres.

In 2019, she finished in 7th place in the women's long jump T11 event at the World Para Athletics Championships held in Dubai, United Arab Emirates.

References

External links 
 

Living people
1999 births
Place of birth missing (living people)
Uzbekistani female long jumpers
Athletes (track and field) at the 2020 Summer Paralympics
Medalists at the 2020 Summer Paralympics
Paralympic athletes of Uzbekistan
Paralympic silver medalists for Uzbekistan
Paralympic athletes with a vision impairment
21st-century Uzbekistani women
Uzbekistani blind people